FIFA 97 (also known as FIFA Soccer 97) is a football simulation video game developed by EA Canada and published by Electronic Arts. It was released for PC on 24 June 1996 and versions for PlayStation, SNES, Mega Drive and Sega Saturn followed.

FIFA 97 is the fourth game in the FIFA series and the second to use the Virtual Stadium engine. Unlike the first game to use the engine, FIFA 97 features polygonal players as opposed to the 2D sprites used in FIFA Soccer '96. The engine however received complaints for being sluggish in the PC and PlayStation versions.

Frenchman David Ginola (then a Newcastle United player) was pictured on the cover of the game in the European market. He also was used for motion capture for the polygonal models in the game, while Brazilian Bebeto was featured on the cover for the Americas and Asia-Pacific markets.

Game features 

The main new feature of the game other than the motion capture was the indoor football mode. There are six ways to play the game, including outdoor and indoor, as well as action and simulation modes. 32-bit AI is used, as well as motion blending technology. It is possible to play six-a-side football in an indoor arena with the ball bouncing off the walls, meaning there are no throw-ins and therefore a much higher-paced game. Commentary is provided by John Motson and Andy Gray while the presenter is Des Lynam. Multiplayer games are also possible with up to 20-players via LAN and 8-players using a modem. The game trailer's tagline was "FIFA 97, it will blow you away."

Most European domestic leagues are featured in the game, including the English Premier League, La Liga, French Division 1, Serie A, Bundesliga, Eredivisie, Allsvenskan and Scottish Football League, with the clubs featured in the game playing in the 1995–96 season. Also featured are teams in the Malaysian Liga Perdana and national teams, as well as the American A-League clubs with fictional teams, composed of the game's creators such as Bruce McMillan and Penny Lee.

It is also possible to field custom teams made up of players from various real teams. However, these teams can only be played with in friendly matches.

Commentary 
The game's commentary included the names of the majority of players on the game, and the names of the teams were also said by John Motson. To keep the commentary from sounding too robotic, EA Sports recorded Motson saying each phrase four different times, each time in a different tone. Several errors plagued the game's commentary, such as John Millar of Heart of Midlothian  being referred to as Joe Miller, who in fact plays for Aberdeen on the game. Also, at times when a goal kick was awarded, the commentator would say that the kick had been given to the opposing team. Another similar error was that a kick-off would be referred to as a cross, as well as a goal in the first minute being described as a goal "that would win it surely". On rare occasions, when the game was being introduced by Des Lynam, the name of a player involved in the game would be said by John Motson, instead of Lynam saying the names of both teams. For example, a match between Partick Thistle F.C. and Kilmarnock F.C. would sometimes be introduced by Lynam saying "Welcome to the big match between-", and Motson's voice interjecting with "MacPherson."

The pronunciation of certain players' names would change depending upon whether they were performing attacking or defensive duties, such as Roy Aitken being referred to as "Akin" if he made a tackle or clearance. Similarly, Alessandro Del Piero, who was called "Del Piero Togon" on the game, was referred to as "Del Piero Tognon", followed by a small hiccuping noise when he performed a tackle.

Reception 

FIFA 97s computer version received a "Gold" sales award from the Verband der Unterhaltungssoftware Deutschland (VUD), indicating sales of at least 100,000 units across Germany, Austria and Switzerland.

The PlayStation version received a wide range of reviews. GamePro gave it a rave review, particularly applauding the motion captured animations, crowd noises, and "detailed, side-busting commentary". GameSpot's Stephen Poole disagreed on the commentary, noting that it is on occasion blatantly inaccurate. However, he opined that the slower pace of the gameplay is more realistic. Additionally praising the new indoor soccer feature, motion capture animation, and sharply rendered players, he concluded the game "does not disappoint." A reviewer for Next Generation, however, insisted that "The simple, sad fact is FIFA '97 is the most disappointing EA Sports game in years." He argued that the slow pace, rather than being realistic, is simply boring. He acknowledged that the visuals are good and the features are comprehensive, but found the slow pace, frame rate, control, and unrealistic ball physics make FIFA '97 a poor offering. The two sports reviewers of Electronic Gaming Monthly took a middle ground, complimenting the graphics, stats, and realism, but agreeing with Next Generation that the play suffers from the slow pace and controls. They rated it overall decent, but not a contender against the leading soccer games.

Both Play magazine in Issue 15 and Official UK PlayStation Magazine in Issue 15 rated the PlayStation version of the game similarly with a score of 70% and 7/10 respectively. Play when comparing it with FIFA 96 commented that it was "Graphically better, but plays worse".

Reviews for the Saturn port were more uniformly middling. Critics often compared it unfavorably to Sega Worldwide Soccer 97. GamePro also noted that the graphics and audio are inferior to those of the PlayStation version. Saturn Power mentioned numerous aggravations with the controls and configurations, and summarized it as "Almost perversely entertaining for a game as flawed as it is." Sega Saturn Magazines Rich Leadbetter found the AI too heavily flawed to provide an accurate simulation of soccer. Like Price, he deemed the game enjoyable despite its flaws, but concluded Sega Worldwide Soccer '97 to be indisputably a wiser purchase.

The Genesis and Super NES versions were reviewed in GamePro by two different critics. Both concluded that the game is a must-have for newcomers to the series, but that FIFA fans would likely find the game redundant due to the minimal change from previous installments.

GamePro also ran a brief review of the Game Boy version, praising it for managing easy-to-follow graphics despite the small screen. They added, "The gameplay isn't exactly speedy – the sprites lope downfield at a sluggish pace – but it's fun working your way through a lengthy tournament to the championship.

See also 
FIFA Soccer 64, a Nintendo 64 game announced as FIFA Soccer 97

References

External links 

1997
1996 video games
Electronic Arts games
Association football video games
Windows games
PlayStation (console) games
Video games developed in Canada
EA Sports games
DOS games
Sega Saturn games
Game Boy games
Super Nintendo Entertainment System games
Sega Genesis games
Tiertex Design Studios games
Video games set in 1996
Video games set in 1997
Rage Games games
Multiplayer and single-player video games
Black Pearl Software games